Hakan Söyler (born 8 April 1983) is a Turkish former professional footballer.

References

1983 births
Living people
Turkish footballers
Gençlerbirliği S.K. footballers
Hacettepe S.K. footballers
Aydınspor footballers
Malatyaspor footballers
Kardemir Karabükspor footballers
Elazığspor footballers
Süper Lig players
Footballers from Ankara
Turkey youth international footballers
Association football defenders